Tsvetayev or Tsvetaev is a Russian masculine surname, its feminine counterpart is Tsvetayeva or Tsvetaeva. It may refer to
Ivan Tsvetaev (1847-1913), Russian art historian, archaeologist and Classical philologist.
Marina Tsvetaeva (1892–1941), Russian poet
Anastasia Tsvetayeva (1894—1993), Russian writer and poet.
Vyacheslav Tsvetayev (1893–1950), Soviet general and Hero of the Soviet Union.

Russian-language surnames